Miljöaktuellt was a Swedish language monthly environmental and business magazine published in Stockholm, Sweden. It existed between 2003 and 2016.

History and profile
Miljöaktuellt was first published on 14 May 2003. The magazine was published eleven issues per year on a monthly basis.

Miljöaktuellt was first published by Naturvårdsverket. The publisher was the International Data Group (IDG) Sweden from 2007 to 2015. Bonnier bought the magazine in September 2015. Its headquarters was in Stockholm.

The magazine dealt with environmental issues and offered business-like solutions focusing on social responsibility and sustainable development. During its existence the magazine published the list of the most influential people on environmental issues in Sweden. The other ranking by the magazine was the Environment Municipality of the Year.

Mikael Salo was the editor-in-chief of Miljöaktuellt.

In 2008 Miljöaktuellt had 19,000 readers. In 2016 the magazine ceased publication.

See also
 List of magazines in Sweden

References

External links
 Official website

2003 establishments in Sweden
2016 disestablishments in Sweden
Bonnier Group
Business magazines published in Sweden
Defunct magazines published in Sweden
Environmental magazines
Magazines established in 2003
Magazines disestablished in 2016
Magazines published in Stockholm
Monthly magazines published in Sweden
Swedish-language magazines